Pleocarphus  is a genus of South American flowering plants in the family Asteraceae.

Species
There is only one known species, Pleocarphus revolutus, found only in Chile.

References

Endemic flora of Chile
Nassauvieae
Monotypic Asteraceae genera